Sringeri Assembly constituency is one of the 224 seats in Karnataka State Assembly in India. It is part of Udupi Chikmagalur Lok Sabha seat.

Members of Legislative Assembly 
Source

Election results

1967 Assembly Election
 K. N. V. Gowda (Indian National Congress) : 12,509 votes 
 H.V. S. Bhatta (Bharatiya Janata Party) : 11,062

2018 Assembly Election
 T D Rajegowda (Indian National Congress) : 62,780 votes 
 D N Jeevaraj (Bharatiya Janata Party) : 60791

See also 
 Chikkamagaluru district
 List of constituencies of Karnataka Legislative Assembly

References 

Assembly constituencies of Karnataka